The WACO Community School District is a rural public school district headquartered in Wayland, Iowa.  It spans Henry, Washington, and Louisa counties, and serves the towns of Wayland, Crawfordsville, and Olds, and the surrounding rural areas.

Chris Armstrong has been the superintendent since 2018.

Schools
The district operates two schools:
 WACO Elementary School, Crawfordsville
 WACO High School, Wayland

WACO High School

Athletics
The Warriors compete in the Southeast Iowa Superconference in the following sports:
Volleyball
Football
Wrestling
Basketball
Track and Field
 Girls' 1989 Class 1A State Champions
Cross Country
Students from WACO can also participate in the following sport(s) with Columbus Community (Columbus Junction):
Softball
Students from WACO can also participate in the following sport(s) with Washington:
Golf
Baseball

See also
List of school districts in Iowa
List of high schools in Iowa

References

External links
 WACO Community School District

School districts in Iowa
Education in Washington County, Iowa
Education in Henry County, Iowa
Education in Louisa County, Iowa
School districts established in 1962
1962 establishments in Iowa